Haberlandia rohdei is a moth in the family Cossidae. It is found in Ghana. The habitat consists of rainforests.

The wingspan is about 17 mm. The forewings are colonial buff with buffy olive lines. The hindwings are ecru-olive with a reticulated buffy olive pattern.

Etymology
The species is named in honour of Professor Dr Michael Rohde.

References

Natural History Museum Lepidoptera generic names catalog

Endemic fauna of Ghana
Moths described in 2011
Metarbelinae
Taxa named by Ingo Lehmann